The 2014 Úrvalsdeild karla, also known as Pepsi-deild karla for sponsorship reasons, was the 103rd season of top-flight Icelandic football. Twelve teams contested the league; the defending champions were KR, who won their twenty-sixth league title in 2013.

On 4 October Stjarnan won their first Úrvalsdeild karla title. Stjarnan went through the season unbeaten in the league and equalled the point record of 52 points.

Teams

The 2014 Úrvalsdeild will be contested by twelve clubs, ten of which played in the division the previous year. The changes from the 2013 campaign are:
 Víkingur Ó. and ÍA were relegated from the 2013 Úrvalsdeild to the 2014 1. deild karla.
 Fjölnir and Víkingur R. were promoted from the 2013 1. deild karla to the 2014 Úrvalsdeild.

Club information

League table

Positions by round

Results
Each team plays every opponent once home and away for a total of 22 matches per club, and 132 matches all together.

Top goalscorers

References

External links
Pepsi-deild karla at KSÍ

Úrvalsdeild karla (football) seasons
1
Iceland
Iceland